Statistics of League of Ireland in the 1976/1977 season.

Overview
It was contested by 14 teams, and Sligo Rovers won the championship.

Final classification

Galway Rovers F.C. and Thurles Town F.C. were elected to the league for next season.

Results

Top scorers

Ireland, 1976-77
1976–77 in Republic of Ireland association football
League of Ireland seasons